is a Japanese professional footballer who plays as a midfielder for Women's Super League club West Ham United and the Japan women's national team.   

A full international since 2019, she represented Japan at the 2020 Summer Olympics in Tokyo, Japan.

Early life 
Hayashi was born in Uji, just south of central Kyoto in Japan. She started playing football for Shinmei JSC Sports Boy Scouts at the age of five. As an eleven-year-old, she was invited to a national team camp for U12 players by the Japan Football Association. At the age of 15, Hayashi moved to Osaka and she started playing with Cerezo Osaka's U15 team.

Club career

Cerezo Osaka Sakai 
Hayashi begun her career with Cerezo Osaka Sakai in 2013 as they entered the second division Challenge League. She was appointed club captain in 2017 and led her club to promotion to the Nadeshiko League Division 1 by the end of the season and won the Division 2 Nadeshiko League Cup.

AIK Fotboll 
On 16 December 2020, Hayashi signed a contract with Swedish Damallsvenskan side AIK Fotball. She made her debut in their pre-season tournament Stockholm Volkswagen Challenge. On 2 May 2021, she scored her first competitive goal for the club against Djurgårdens IF. On June 5, 2021, she would netted a freekick goal against Kif Örebro that would see her nominated for goal of the year by Sportbladet. In total, she made 36 appearances for the club and netted 7 goals.

West Ham United 
On 8 September 2022, Hayashi signed a two-year-contract with West Ham United for an undisclosed fee from Swedish Damallsvenskan side AIK Fotboll. She scored her first goal for the club in a 2-1 win against Aston Villa on 15 October 2022.

International career 
Hayashi received her first international call-up in December 2019.

Career statistics

Club

International

Honours 
Cerezo Osaka Sakai

 Nadeshiko League Cup Division 2: 2017, 2019

Japan U20

 FIFA U-20 Women's World Cup: 2018

Japan

 EAFF E-1 Football Championship: 2019, 2022

References

External links 
 

1998 births
Living people
Japanese women's footballers
Women's association football midfielders
Cerezo Osaka Sakai Ladies players
Japan women's international footballers
Footballers at the 2020 Summer Olympics
Olympic footballers of Japan
West Ham United F.C. Women players
Women's Super League players

Japanese expatriate sportspeople in England